Else Reppen (14 November 1933 – 28 February 2006) was a Norwegian philanthropist, Pentecostal and a strict advocate of temperance. During her lifetime she was well known of serving others and caring little for herself. In 1984, she founded "Action Poland" which later became known as "Friends of Poland". This is a small group of people that transports food, clothings and other necessities in a bus every September to institutions such as churches and orphan homes in Poland. From 1996 to 2005, she served as President of the Norwegian WWCTU, World's Woman's Christian Temperance Union.

Early years and marriage
Else Reppen was born in Flekkefjord, Vest-Agder in southern Norway on 14 November 1933 to Nils and Sofie Staaby. They were a working-class family, her father being Flekkefjord's first typographer, her mother staying at home with 8 children. After having completed the obligatory primary education, which lasted for 7 years those days, she began working. In 1952, she married Magne Reppen (d. 1992), also of Flekkefjord. They became members of Pinsemenigheten Salen (a local Pentecostal congregation) early, as Else Reppen later explained it: "When we realized the importance of the Baptism of the Holy Ghost". Their first child, Sissel Reppen, was born a year later, in 1953. In 1960, Nils Terje Reppen was born.

References

Norwegian philanthropists
1933 births
2006 deaths
Woman's Christian Temperance Union people
20th-century philanthropists
People from Flekkefjord
20th-century women philanthropists